Awad or Aouad or Awwad is an Arabic given name and surname.  People with the name include:

Given name
of the origin عوّاد
Awwad Eid Al-Aradi Al-Balawi, former Director General of Saudi Arabian Border Guards, Ministry of Interior, Kingdom of Saudi Arabia
Awad Hamad al-Bandar (1945–2007), Iraqi chief judge under Saddam Hussein's presidency
Awad Khleifat (born 1945), Jordanian politician

Surname
of the origin عوض
 Gamal Awad, Egyptian squash player
 Jacqueline Cabaj Awad, Swedish tennis player 
 Krayem Awad, Austrian painter, sculptor and poet
 Mira Awad, Israeli Arab musician
 Mohammed Awad, Iraqi politician
 Mubarak Awad, Palestinian-American psychologist
 Nihad Awad, American activist
 Ramzi Aouad, Australian murderer
 Saad Awad, American mixed martial artist
 Samer Awad, Syrian footballer

of the origin عوّاد
 Ahmed El Aouad, French-Moroccan footballer
 Awwad Alawwad (born 1972), Saudi politician and government minister
 Juliet Awwad (born 1951), Jordanian actress and director of Armenian descent
 Mohamed El Amine Aouad, Algerian

Other uses
A Word A Day, Anu Garg

Arabic-language surnames
Arabic masculine given names